Higher Ground may refer to:

Military tactics
 High ground, an area of elevated terrain

Film and television 
 Higher Ground (film), a 2011 drama starring Vera Farmiga
 Higher Ground (TV series), a 2000 Canadian drama/adventure series
 Higher Ground, a 1988 TV movie starring John Denver

Music

Albums 
 Higher Ground (Barbra Streisand album), 1997
 Higher Ground (Joan Kennedy album), 1992
 Higher Ground (John Denver album), 1989
 Higher Ground (Johnny Hammond album), 1973
 Higher Ground (Tammy Wynette album), 1987
 Higher Ground Hurricane Relief Benefit Concert (album), 2005
 Higher Ground, a 2002 album by The Blind Boys of Alabama
 Higher Ground, a 2007 album by David Tipper
 Higher Ground, a 1988 album by Vernessa Mitchell

Songs 
 "Higher Ground" (Idde Schultz song), English-language version of "Högre mark", 1995
 "Higher Ground" (Jennifer Rush song), 1989
 "Higher Ground" (Martin Garrix song), 2020
 "Higher Ground" (Rasmussen song), represented Denmark in the Eurovision Song Contest 2018
 "Higher Ground" (Stevie Wonder song), 1973, covered by the Red Hot Chili Peppers in 1989
 "Higher Ground" (UB40 song), 1993
 "Higher Ground", by Amorphis from Far from the Sun
 "Higher Ground", by Imagine Dragons from Mercury – Acts 1 & 2
 "Higher Ground", by Juno Reactor from the video game Frequency
 "Higher Ground", by Odesza from A Moment Apart
 "Higher Ground", by Sasha with Sam Mollison from The Qat Collection
 "Higher Ground", by TNGHT from TNGHT
 "Higher Ground", written by Charles H. Gabriel and Johnson Oatman Jr., 1898

Organizations 
 Higher Ground (support group), a Michigan-based HIV/AIDS non-profit
Higher Ground Productions, a film production company founded in 2018 by  Barack and Michelle Obama
 Higher Ground Project, to support children who survived the 2004 Indian Ocean earthquake
 Higher Ground Records, a music label owned by Sony Music